Leung Uk Tsuen is a village in Pat Heung, Yuen Long District, Hong Kong.

Administration
Leung Uk Tsuen is a recognized village under the New Territories Small House Policy.

References

Villages in Yuen Long District, Hong Kong
Pat Heung